Angela McGinnis (born November 3, 1986) is an American female volleyball player. She was part of the United States women's national volleyball team.

She participated in the 2009 FIVB Volleyball World Grand Prix.
On the club level she played for Igtisadchi Baku VC in 2009.

References

External links
 Profile at FIVB.org

1986 births
Living people
American women's volleyball players
Place of birth missing (living people)
Setters (volleyball)
Expatriate volleyball players in Azerbaijan
American expatriate sportspeople in Azerbaijan
Florida Gators women's volleyball players